First National Bank South Dakota is an affiliate bank of First National of Nebraska and is headquartered in Yankton, South Dakota.  The First National Bank South Dakota was established 1962 as Valley State Bank, and has been a member of the Federal Deposit Insurance Corporation since October 5, 1962.

Branches 

First National Bank South Dakota was formed on October 5, 1962, with the original name of Valley State Bank.  Its name was changed to its current name on July 19, 1994.  Commercial Trust And Savings Bank in Mitchell, South Dakota was acquired by First National Bank November 5, 1999.

References

Banks based in South Dakota
Privately held companies based in South Dakota
Banks established in 1934
American companies established in 1934
1934 establishments in South Dakota